The 2011 BSWW Mundialito is a beach soccer tournament that takes place at Praia da Rocha, Portimão, Portugal from August 10 to 12. This competition is played in a round-robin format.

Participating nations

Final standings

Schedule and results

Winners

Awards

Top scorers

5 goals
 Nuno Belchior
4 goals
 André
 M. Plata
 O. Cervantes
 D. Samoun
3 goals
 Betinho
 Sidney
 J. Santos
2 goals
 Bruno
 Madjer
 R. Villalobos
 A. Rodríguez
 Barbotti
 Touchat

1 goal
 Benjamin
 Anderson
 Fred
 Alan
 B. Torres
 R. Coimbra
 C. Fargoso
 J. Navarrete
 J. Basquaise
 J.-M Edouard

See also
Beach soccer
BSWW Mundialito
Euro Beach Soccer League

External links
Beach Soccer Worldwide

BSWW Mundialito
Mun
2011 in beach soccer